Gornja Kupčina is a village near Jastrebarsko, Croatia, around 30 km west of Zagreb. Its population in 2011 was 148.

References

Populated places in Zagreb County